Desmond David is a retired Malaysian footballer who played for Penang and the national team as a goalkeeper. In 1974, he was part of the Malaysia Cup-winning Penang side.

Personal life
Desmond David is a Malaysian Indian of Tamil descent. His daughter, Nicol David was the former squash world champion.

Honours

Club
Penang
 Malaya Cup
Winners: 1974

References 

Malaysian footballers
Malaysia international footballers
Association football goalkeepers
1947 births
Living people
Sportspeople from Penang